Aaron García (born June 14, 1982) is an American boxer in the Featherweight division. He earned the featherweight silver medal at the 2003 Pan American Games.

Amateur titles
1999 National Golden Gloves bantamweight champion
2001 National Golden Gloves featherweight champion
2003 United States Amateur featherweight champion

Professional career
He made his professional debut on September 18, 2004, against Gerardo Robles. Aaron retired from the boxing in 2006 after an upset loss to the veteran Saul Ochoa, but returned in 2008.

On February 26, 2011 García upset title contender Alejandro Lopez (20-1). The bout was held at the Palms Casino Resort in Las Vegas, Nevada.

Professional boxing record

References

External links

American boxers of Mexican descent
People from Vista, California
Boxers from California
Featherweight boxers
Boxers at the 2003 Pan American Games
Winners of the United States Championship for amateur boxers
1982 births
Living people
American male boxers
Pan American Games medalists in boxing
Pan American Games silver medalists for the United States
Medalists at the 2003 Pan American Games